David Walter Davies (born 1 October 1888, date of death unknown) was a Welsh footballer who played for Oldham Athletic and Sheffield United in the Football League First Division.  He also made two appearances for Wales. He was born in Treharris, Wales.

Club career
Davies was a former miner who made his league début whilst at Oldham Athletic in 1912.  He soon transferred to Sheffield United via a brief stay at Stockport County.  He spend two seasons at Bramall Lane, playing in the side that won the FA Cup in 1915 (although he himself did not feature in the final.)

With the outbreak of war Davies was released and returned to Wales where he became a miner once more whilst continuing to play football for local teams.

International career
Davis made two appearances for Wales, the first whilst at Treharris, the second after his move to Oldham Athletic.

References

1888 births
Year of death missing
Welsh footballers
English Football League players
Wales international footballers
Association football forwards
Oldham Athletic A.F.C. players
Stockport County F.C. players
Sheffield United F.C. players
Cardiff City F.C. players
Millwall F.C. players
People from Treharris
Sportspeople from Merthyr Tydfil County Borough
Treharris Athletic Western F.C. players